Paula González Berodia (born 2 May 1985 in San Felices de Buelna) is a Spanish middle and long distance runner. In 2010, 2012 and 2013 she won the 3000m race at the Spanish Indoor Championships and in 2011 and 2014 placed second. In outdoor races, Berodia has won two silver medals in the 5000m race and at Seville has also won three 10 km races, two half-marathons and two full marathons. In 2016, when she was the winner of the 42 km Marathon at Seville in a record time, she qualified to represent her country at the 2016 Summer Olympics. However, she had to pull out due to an injury. In 2017, Berodia won the Seville Marathon again and therefore qualified for the London Cup.

Competition record

Personal bests
3000 metres - 9:22.97 (2013) / 9:01.37(i) (2012)
5000 metres - 15:37.62 (2014)
10000 metres - 32:56.13 (2014)
Half Marathon - 1:11:04 (2016)
Marathon - 2:28:54 (2017)

References

External links

Living people
Spanish female middle-distance runners
Spanish female long-distance runners
Athletes from Cantabria
1985 births
21st-century Spanish women